Big Market  is the leading Albanian supermarket chain, with 135 outlets (130 supermarkets and 5 hypermarkets), 20 shareholders and 1500 workers throughout the country. Its slogan is “Big Market, know what to choose”.

On 1 December 2018, the company opened a hypermarket called Big Market Citypark.

See also
 List of supermarket chains in Albania

References

External links
 Official website

Retail companies established in 1999
Albanian brands

1999 establishments in Albania